Hamburger Hamlet or "The Hamlet", was a chain of restaurants based in Los Angeles, a point of reference for Angelenos and for the creative industries that were located in the city. Opened in 1950 by film actor Harry Lewis with his future wife Marilyn (m.1952), it grew to a chain of 24 locations, including Chicago and the Washington, D.C. metro areas. before they were all either sold or closed down. 

The restaurants served hamburgers topped with what were considered exotic combinations of toppings, such as a bacon cheeseburger with Russian dressing. A famed side dish were the "little fried onions". Tomato relish was provided at each table. They also served omelettes and Mexican dishes.
In 1987 the Lewises opened upscale restaurant Kate Mantilini.
In 1997 Koo Koo Roo bought 14 Hamlet locations for $33 million.

In Hollywood biographies of both Peggy Lee and Alfred Hitchcock, Hamburger Hamlet is mentioned as a favorite haunt. In the novel American Dream Machine, author Matthew Specktor mourns the closing of the Sunset Boulevard Hamlet as the passing of a bygone era of Old Hollywood glamour. In 2014, Los Angeles Magazine published the article Vintage Los Angeles: The Tragedy of Hamburger Hamlet, where author Alison Martino wrote:
It was where you bumped into celebrities and industry moguls in a casual environment, dining in darkly lit giant red leather chairs. But there was nothing casual about the clientele. Where else could you see Dean Martin sipping a martini at the bar, Lucille Ball hair spraying her red locks in the ladies room, Bette Davis chain smoking in the Tap Room, or Frank Sinatra taking a meeting with his publicist? I witnessed all of this first hand.  Even the restaurant’s hostess, actress and singer Frances Davis, who was once married to Miles Davis, would occasionally burst into song and dance while taking you to your table. I remember Francis and Diahann Carroll discussing chord progressions in the lobby.

MeTV wrote:
In an era when putting bacon and cheese on a burger was considered luxuriantly deluxe, Hamburger Hamlet topped its burger with guacamole, baked beans and marinara sauce. They served a burger with jalapeños on garlic toast. The "Emperor Henry IV" burger came with ham, bacon and Russian dressing. As far back as 1977, the restaurant was even serving a bunless burger for the carb conscious. (It was based in L.A., after all.)
Locations included 6914 Hollywood Boulevard, Sunset Boulevard within the West Hollywood city limits, along Adams Blvd. in Costa Mesa, Pasadena (closed in 2014 to become a Du-par's), and the last location to close, Sherman Oaks.

External link
Hamburger Hamlet historic menu

References

Defunct restaurants in Hollywood, Los Angeles
Restaurants established in 1950
Restaurants in West Hollywood, California
Hamburger restaurants in the United States